Lehtse is a small borough in Tapa Parish, Lääne-Viru County in northern Estonia. As of 2011 Census, the settlement's population was 383.

References

Boroughs and small boroughs in Estonia
Kreis Jerwen